Asian Business Case Competition @ Nanyang is an international undergraduate business case competition in Singapore, established in 2007. It is organised by Nanyang Business School’s case club Business Solutions and is backed by the Asian Business Case Centre. ABCC @ Nanyang is a student-led case competition with a focus on sustainability.
Every year, the competition hosts undergraduate participants from business schools around the world, applying their knowledge and skills to solve real-life business problems.
ABCC @ Nanyang has been certified carbon neutral by TheCarbonNeutral Company.

Activities

Case competition 

The competition centres around a 40-hour-long case, where students would strategize their best solution to a business case study, and present their case to a panel of judges. In 2017, after one successful decade of hosting Asian Business Case Competition, the format of competition was changed to include one 8-hour case, and one 24-hour case to provide an enhanced competition experience.

History 

The competition was first established in 2008, steadily growing into one of Asia's largest business case competitions, having gathered students from North America, Europe, Australia, and Asia over the years. It is currently the oldest and longest-running international business case competition based in Singapore. Since its inception, it has featured participants from numerous universities all over the world including the National University of Singapore, Nanyang Technological University, the University of Toronto, the University of New South Wales, the University of Oxford, the University of Cambridge, and the University of Southern California.

Past Champions

Sustainability initiatives 

ABCC @ Nanyang has adopted and adhered to several sustainability practices. Besides sourcing for environmentally-friendly materials for use during the competition where possible, ABCC @ Nanyang also purchases carbon credits and is carbon-neutral certified.

A one-day event during ABCC is dedicated to sustainability each year. It has taken different forms in the past few years including panel discussions and mini-case presentations, revolving around sustainability. Some of the highlights include the sustainability roundtable event in 2010, where participants were split into different groups to hold a discussion based on the central theme of “Profitable Shade of Green”. Other formats include 2011's event, which took the form of a mini-case, where teams were challenged to come up with a strategic plan for sustainable growth in the Small-Medium Enterprise (SME) context, with a focus on engaging fresh graduate talent.

Organisers 

The competition is organized by students from Nanyang Business School's case club, Business Solutions. Nanyang Business School is part of Nanyang Technological University, based in Singapore. Besides ABCC @ Nanyang, Business Solution also organises the Singapore Business Case Competition, a case competition targeted at students from the local tertiary institutions in Singapore.

External links 
Asian Business Case Competition @ Nanyang Official Website

References 

Management education